Scott Bailey  may refer to:

Scott Bailey (ice hockey) (born 1972), ice hockey player
Scott Bailey (actor) (born 1978), American actor
Scott Bailey (curler) (born 1970), Canadian curler
Scott Bailey (bishop) (1916–2005), bishop of the Episcopal Diocese of West Texas
Arthur Scott Bailey (1877–1949), American writer
 The 1755 edition of A New Universal Etymological English Dictionary by Nathan Bailey

See also 
Scott & Bailey, British detective drama series that debuted on ITV on 29 May 2011